John Butler (1871 – 3 October 1959) was a British racewalker. He competed in the men's 3500 metres walk at the 1908 Summer Olympics.

References

1871 births
1959 deaths
Athletes (track and field) at the 1908 Summer Olympics
British male racewalkers
Olympic athletes of Great Britain
Place of birth missing